Les Gaillards Paris Rugby Club is a French rugby club based in Paris.

History
The club was founded in 2004.

References

External links
Les Gaillards' official website

Rugby union clubs in Paris
Rugby clubs established in 2004